Bartle may refer to:

 A surname of Cornish origin derived from Bottrell, in old form or Bottral. It originated from and is a corruption of Botteaux, which is a surname of Norman origin. 

 The Bartle Test of Gamer Psychology which categorises players of multiplayer online games.
 R. v. Bartle, a key case in Canadian law.
 Bartle Bogle Hegarty, a British advertising agency.
 Bartle Hall Convention Center, a convention center in Kansas City, Missouri, United States
 Bartle, Indiana, an unincorporated community in the United States

People with the surname Bartle 
 Christopher Bartle, British equestrian.
 Harold Roe Bartle (1901 - 1974), lawyer, banker, and politician.
 Harvey Bartle III (b. 1941), chief judge of the United States District Court for the Eastern District of Pennsylvania.
 Jean Ashworth Bartle (b. 1947), choral conductor and teacher.
 Matt Bartle (b. 1965), a Republican politician from Missouri, USA. 
 Richard Bartle, namesake of the aforementioned Bartle Test of Gamer Psychology
 Robert G. Bartle, mathematician and author.

People with the given name Bartle 
 Bartle Bull (b. 1970), journalist and Middle East expert.